Bilete de Papagal was a Romanian left-wing publication edited by Tudor Arghezi, begun as a daily newspaper and soon after issued as a weekly satirical and literary magazine. It was published at three different intervals: 1928-1930, 1937-1938, 1944-1945.

Name
The title made reference to a once-popular form of busking and fortune telling, one involving a person playing a barrel organ while a trained parrot would pick up predictions written on scraps of folded paper that were placed in an open box (the notes were known as bilete de papagal - "parrot tickets"). The use implied a very small format; Arghezi, who later adopted the bilet as an original form of short prose, explained his style choices in the editorial for the first issue (2 February 1928):
"A newspaper this small has never before been published, not even among ants. Lacking a large newspaper in which to write important stupidities, the editor of this rolling paper gives light to what is less than a flyer and confines himself to publishing grinning tidbits."

In 1929, Demostene Botez wrote:
"Having the rectangular and slender format of a restaurant menu, Bilete de Papagal has signified, for more than a year, day by day, the purest literary manifestation."

History
Bilete de Papagal accepted contributions from both traditionally-minded and modernist authors, partly reflecting Arghezi's own attitudes towards literature. While celebrating the classics of Romanian literature, it rejected the dominant nationalist school and especially its far right tendencies, rejecting especially the neo-Orthodox aesthetics developed by Nichifor Crainic's Gândirea, as well as Iron Guard mysticism.

Critical of Romania's royal dynasty, Bilete de Papagal was not published after King Carol II established his authoritarian regime, and was only issued again after the end of successive dictatorships for the larger part of World War II. It was, however, the basis for a similarly titled column in the newspaper Informaţia Zilei, contributed by Arghezi until 1943 - when it was banned by Ion Antonescu's government for publishing the virulent Baroane ("Thou Baron"), a satire of Nazi Germany's ambassador to Romania, Manfred Freiherr von Killinger (Arghezi himself was interned near Târgu Jiu). It ceased publication for a third and final time in 1945, after its editor was singled out as an adversary to the Romanian Communist Party (which was strengthening its grip on Romanian society during the Petru Groza government).

Notable contributors
Felix Aderca
Mihai Beniuc
Geo Bogza
Eugeniu Botez
Otilia Cazimir
Benjamin Fondane
Eugène Ionesco
Mihail Sadoveanu
Ionel Teodoreanu
Păstorel Teodoreanu
George Topîrceanu
Paul Zarifopol

Notes

See also
 List of magazines in Romania

References
Eugen Marinescu (ed.). (1986). Din presa literară românească (1918-1944), Ed. Albatros, Bucharest.
Demostene Botez. (January 1929). "Miscellanea. Bilete de papagal", in Viața Românească, pp. 121–122

Defunct literary magazines published in Europe
Defunct magazines published in Romania
Literary magazines published in Romania
Magazines established in 1928
Magazines disestablished in 1945
Romanian-language magazines
Satirical magazines published in Europe
Weekly magazines published in Romania